Broomhill is an affluent, middle class area of Aberdeen, Scotland. It is situated in the west end and is accessible by the A92 road (South Anderson Drive). The area is home to a primary school, Broomhill.

References

Areas of Aberdeen